The MI 09 (French: Matériel d'Interconnexion de 2009, English: interconnection rolling stock of 2009) is a double-deck, dual-voltage electric multiple unit trainset that is operated on line A of the Réseau Express Régional (RER), a hybrid suburban commuter and rapid transit system serving Paris and its Île-de-France suburbs.

The 140 five-car trains were built by a consortium of French manufacturer Alstom and Canadian conglomerate Bombardier. The MI 09 is considered to be a part of Alstom's X'Trapolis Duplex platform and is an evolution of earlier the MI 2N series, which has been in use since 1998. The final assembly of the trains was performed at Alstom's Valenciennes factory and Bombardier's Crespin factory between 2010 and 2017. The first set was placed into regular passenger service on 5 December 2011.

The introduction of the MI 09 allowed for the MS 61 trains to be retired on 16 April 2016 and also allowed RATP to shift the MI 84 trains to the RER B by 24 February 2017.

History

The Réseau Express Régional (RER) a hybrid suburban commuter and rapid transit system serving Paris and its suburbs. The RER A line is, by far, the busiest in the system and is one of the busiest single rail lines in the world, serving over 1.2 million passengers per day.  In an effort to relieve overcrowding on the line, the RATP added 43 MI 2N double-deck trains in 1998. Double-deck trains can carry up to 2,600 people per train, compared to 1,887 people on the single-deck MS 61 trains that had been used on the RER A since it opened.

The MI 2N series double-deck trains proved so successful and popular that in April 2009, Transport Syndicate of the Ile de France (STIF) and RATP Group placed an order for 60 MI 09 trainsets, an improved version of the MI 2N that would be built by the same Alstom-Bombardier consortium. The initial contract was worth €917 million ($992 million) with RATP provided €617 million ($667 million) of funding and STIF providing the remaining €300 million ($324 million).

For each five-car trainset, Alstom manufactured the two end cars, which contain the cabs, while Bombardier manufactured the three middle cars. Alstom assembled its cars at their Valenciennes Petite-Forêt factory, while Bombardier assembled its cars at their Crespin factory. In addition, six other Alstom factories supplied parts to the program: the Ornans factory produced the traction motors, the Le Creusot factory supplied the bogies, the Tarbes factory produced traction chain equipment, the Petit Quevilly factory manufactured the main transformer, and both the Saint-Ouen and Villeurbanne factory were involved in supplying the onboard passenger information and electronic control systems. Barat Group performed various elements of the MI 09's assembly, such as the installation of secondary doors, lightings and miscellaneous electronics, a fireproof and soundproof cabin partitions, and other interior fittings.

On 8 February 2011, the MI 09 trainset was officially unveiled and it was announced that certification testing was underway using three MI 09 trainsets. During December 2011, the first trainset commenced revenue operations.

In June 2012, an additional 70 trainsets were added to the order, valued at €1 billion ($1.3 billion), followed by a third order in February 2015 for 10 additional trainsets, valued at €150 million ($162 million). In total, 140 trainsets were delivered at a cost of €2.067 billion.

The introduction of the MI 09 allowed for the RER's fleet of single-deck MS 61 trains, which dated back to the RER network's opening, to be retired on 16 April 2016. The delivery of the MI 09 also allowed RATP to shift the single-deck MI 84 trains to the RER B by 24 February 2017.

Design 

To facilitate speedy boarding times, each carriage features three wide doors on each side of the vehicle and floors that are level to the platforms. To readily facilitate travel by people of reduced mobility, 34 dedicated seats are installed on each train along with two areas intended for use by passengers in wheelchairs; seats are also furnished with accessible support bars.

The trainsets have been designed to reduce energy consumption with regenerative braking systems that capture power during braking, a high-performance traction chain, and a refrigerated ventilation system that consumes less energy than a traditional air-conditioning system. Trains are also equipped with a train-to-ground Wi-Fi link that transmits information about the train's location and performance, which can aid in determining when maintenance may be required.

By using electric (regenerative and electrodynamic) braking, less particle pollutants are emitted from the disc brakes. High particle pollution in the underground RER stations in Paris have been a source of criticism in the past.

The manufacturers also gave considerable attention to the aesthetic design of the MI 09 during the train's development process, hiring MBD Design to help guide the style of the train. Some of the style choices include boarding areas that provide a full view of both the upper and lower decks, an internal lighting system that uses porthole-shaped fixtures which designers say provide a more pleasant light, and seat fabric with a floral and plant theme.

Each car also features an audio and visual information system, which provides information on the next stop through video monitor graphics and voice announcements. For security and safety purposes, a CCTV surveillance system has been integrated that covers all interior areas.

Formations 
As of 01 March 2022, 140 MI 09 trainsets were based at the Achères, Rueil-Malmaison, Sucy-en-Brie and Torcy RATP depots.

As shown below, the trainsets are formed with three motored cars and two non-powered (trailer) cars (3M2T).

 < or > show a pantograph. Cars 1 and 5 were each equipped with one pantograph.

Fleet
The number of Mi09 trainsets is 140 , numbered 1601/02 to 1879/80 . All are in service on line A of the Île-de-France RER.

Listing Fleet Mi09 (in french)

Photo gallery

References

Réseau Express Régional multiple units
Double-decker EMUs
Electric multiple units of France
25 kV AC multiple units
Alstom multiple units
Bombardier Transportation multiple units
1500 V DC multiple units of France